Leia Inc. is an American company producing 3D Lightfield products and software applications.

Leia is headquartered in Menlo Park, California, with a nano-fabrication center in Palo Alto, a content team in Los Angeles and Auckland, New Zealand, and industrialization center in Suzhou, China.

History 
The company was founded in 2014 as a spin-off of HP Labs. Its research into the holographic display concept under HP was published by Nature in 2013. CEO David Fattal explained that its diffraction system would address shortcomings with other mobile 3D display systems, such as being able to be seen by multiple viewers at once, using the display in its original 2D mode with no loss of resolution and not requiring CPU-intensive eye tracking. The company foresaw uses of its technology in mobile devices, automobiles, and medical applications.

In May 2016, Leia announced a partnership with Altice to market a smartphone featuring its technology.

In 2017, Red Digital Cinema announced its intent to produce a high-end smartphone featuring the technology (the Red Hydrogen One). As part of its development, Red entered into a strategic partnership with Leia, including funding, and Red's founder Jim Jannard joining Leia's board of directors.

In 2018, Leia launched its lightfield content platform LeiaLoft™ including an Android App Store and a developer portal.

The RED Hydrogen phone featuring Leia's switchable lightfield display product was launched on November 2, 2018 in the United States via AT&T and Verizon and in Mexico via Telcel.

In July 2019, Leia and Continental announced a long-term partnership to bring lightfield displays and content to the automotive world.

In 2020, Leia launched the Lume Pad, a B2B Android tablet featuring its recent switchable 10.8-in Lightfield display, designed to service the Education, Medical, Retail, and Hospitality industries.

Lume Pad won 2 CES 2021 Awards (Computer Hardware & Components and Digital Imaging & Photography).

In 2021, Leia launched the consumer edition of the Lume Pad. The Lume Pad is also part of the launchpad program on amazon.

References

External links 
 

Companies based in California
American companies established in 2014
3D imaging
Holography
Display technology